Grate may refer to:
Grate, the metal part of a fireplace where the fire is placed 
Grate, the act of using a grater, a kitchen utensil
Grate, or grille, a barrier through which small objects can fall, while larger objects cannot
Grating, a covering of a drain

People with the surname 
Don Grate (1923–2014), American sportsman
Eric Grate (1896–1983), Swedish sculptor, painter and graphics artist
Pablo Grate (born 1967), Swedish sprint canoeist
Shawn Grate (born 1976), American serial killer